"Don't Stop" is a song by Australian pop rock band 5 Seconds of Summer, taken from their self-titled debut album, 5 Seconds of Summer (2014). The song was released on 16 June 2014 through Capitol Records and Hi or Hey Records as the album's second single.

Critical reception
Amy Davidson of Digital Spy gave the song 4/5 stars, stating "Blink-182 may have released their first song long before any of the Aussie four-piece were even born, but that hasn't deterred 5SOS from being the band's loyal understudies. 'Don't Stop' sees them jolting new life into an otherwise flagging pop punk genre, charging ahead as leaders of the revival." It is also described as a power pop track.

Chart performance
The song debuted at number two on the UK Singles Chart, selling 80,022 copies, 3,000 copies behind Ella Henderson's "Ghost".

Music video 
A lyric video for the single was released on 5 May 2014 through the band's Vevo channel. The official music video was released two weeks later on 19 May 2014 at a total length of three minutes and 38 seconds. It features each band member dressed as a superhero, trying to save and do good deeds to people. Calum Hood is Cal-Pal, Ashton Irwin is SmAsh!, Michael Clifford is Mike-Ro-Wave, and Luke Hemmings is Dr. Fluke. As of November 2022, it has over 90 million views.

Extended play
An extended play was released in 2014. The version for streaming contains five tracks: "Don’t Stop", "Rejects", "Try Hard", "Wrapped Around Your Finger", and "If You Don’t Know".

B-side
A B-side was released in 2016 which contains seven tracks: three "Don’t Stop" versions (Acoustic, Calum demo, and Ash demo), "Rejects", "Try Hard", "Wrapped Around Your Finger", and "If You Don’t Know".

Track listings

Notes
 signifies an additional producer

Personnel

Luke Hemmings – rhythm guitar, lead vocals
Michael Clifford – lead guitar, lead vocals
Calum Hood – bass guitar, lead vocals
Ashton Irwin – drums, vocals

"Don't Stop"
Chris Lord-Alge – mixing
Luke Potashnick – additional programming
Eddy Thrower – additional programming
Josh Wilkinson – additional programming
Keith Armstrong – assistant mixing
Nik Karpen – assistant mixing
Andrew Schubert – additional engineering
Dmitar "Dim-E" Krnjaic – additional engineering
Ted Jensen – mastering

"Rejects"
John Feldmann – mixing, recording, producer
Zakk Cervini – engineering, programming
Colin Cunningham – engineering, programming
Bunt Stafford-Clark – mastering

"Try Hard"
John Feldmann – mixing, recording, producer
Zakk Cervini – engineering, programming
Colin Cunningham – engineering, programming
Bunt Stafford-Clark – mastering

"If You Don't Know"
Steve Robinson – mixing, recording, producer
Luke Potashnick – additional production
Eddy Thrower – additional production
Bunt Stafford-Clark – mastering

"Wrapped Around Your Finger"
John Feldmann – mixing, recording, producer
Zakk Cervini – engineering, programming
Colin Cunningham – engineering, programming
Bunt Stafford-Clark – mastering

Photography
Tom van Schelven

Art direction and design
Richard Andrews

Charts

Weekly charts

Year-end charts

Certifications

Release history

References

2014 singles
2014 songs
5 Seconds of Summer songs
Capitol Records singles
Irish Singles Chart number-one singles
Number-one singles in New Zealand
Number-one singles in Scotland
Song recordings produced by Steve Robson
Songs written by busbee
Songs written by Calum Hood
Songs written by Luke Hemmings
Songs written by Steve Robson